Marisol Nichols (born November 2, 1973) is an American actress, known for her roles as Nadia Yassir on the Fox series 24 and Hermione Lodge on the CW drama series Riverdale.

Early life
Nichols was born in the Rogers Park neighborhood of Chicago, Illinois, and grew up in Naperville, Illinois, with her mother, who is of Mexican descent, and her stepfather, Randy. Her biological father is of Russian-Jewish and Hungarian-Jewish descent. She is the oldest of three siblings, having two younger brothers.

Career
In 1996, she appeared in episodes of Due South and Beverly Hills, 90210. In 1997, she made her movie debut as Audrey Griswold in the film Vegas Vacation with Chevy Chase and Beverly D'Angelo. She also had supporting roles in the films Scream 2, Friends 'Til the End, Can't Hardly Wait, Jane Austen's Mafia and The Sex Monster.

From 2000 to 2002, she starred in the Showtime drama series Resurrection Blvd.. In 2001, she played Bahraini Princess (Sheika) Meriam Al Khalifa in the made-for-TV movie The Princess and the Marine. In 2003, she made guest appearances on episodes of Friends, CSI: Crime Scene Investigation, Law & Order: Special Victims Unit, Nip/Tuck and Charmed. Marisol's Charmed episode, "Chris-Crossed", was the show's highest-rated non-season-premiere episode. In 2006, she appeared in six episodes of Cold Case and starred in the film Big Momma's House 2.

She starred in the short-lived TV series Blind Justice in 2005 and In Justice, in 2006. In 2007, she starred in  24 as Special Agent Nadia Yassir. In 2008, she starred in the film Felon with Stephen Dorff.

In 2010, Nichols portrayed Sarah Monahan in the short-lived supernatural crime drama The Gates, a summer series on ABC.

She also was a guest star in an episode of NCIS: Los Angeles in 2010, as Tracy Keller, former partner and potential romantic interest for Special Agent G. Callen (Chris O'Donnell). Nichols' character appears in the sixth episode of Season 2. She also had a cameo in Kristin Chenoweth's music video for "I Want Somebody (Bitch About)". Nichols also portrayed "The Desert Wolf" on MTV's show Teen Wolf.

In 2012, Nichols starred in the ABC TV series GCB, with Leslie Bibb, Kristin Chenoweth, Annie Potts, Jennifer Aspen and Miriam Shor.

In 2017, Nichols began starring as Hermione Lodge, the mother of Veronica Lodge, in the teen drama series Riverdale, loosely based on the Archie comic book series. On February 23, 2020, Nichols announced that she would be leaving Riverdale ahead of its fifth season, making season four her last on the show. However, in June 2020, Nichols revealed that after having a talk with showrunner Roberto Aguirre-Sacasa, she would be staying on for season five.

Personal life
In November 1999, Nichols married Andrea Sorrentino, whom she met in Italy while filming the movie My Father's Shoes. They later divorced. In April 2008, she married director Taron Lexton. They have a daughter, born in September 2008. In November 2018, Nichols filed for divorce.

Nichols resides in Los Angeles, California.

In the 1990s, Nichols became a Scientologist, having been introduced to it by her chiropractor.

Volunteer work and activism
In an interview with Marie Claire, Nichols stated that she was raped when she was eleven, and that it "changed the entire trajectory of [my] life in a day." This inspired her to start a non-profit organization called Foundation for a Slavery Free World and has regularly spoken publicly about sex trafficking and ways to prevent children from becoming trafficked victims.

In 2012, as her career slowed down, Nichols began working with former FBI and CIA agents, Navy SEALs and Green Berets, as well as local law enforcement who have left government agencies and gone independent to help trap child sex predators. Her role involved acting as "bait", playing whatever role the situation called for, such as pretending to be a parent who was pimping out a child. In partnership with nonprofit organization Operation Underground Railroad, Nichols' work took her across the United States and other countries globally, including Haiti and Venezuela.

Filmography

Film

Television

Music videos

References

External links
 
 
 

1973 births
Living people
Actresses from Chicago
American film actresses
American Scientologists
American television actresses
American voice actresses
American actresses of Mexican descent
American people of Hungarian-Jewish descent
Actresses from Naperville, Illinois
Hispanic and Latino American actresses
20th-century American actresses
21st-century American actresses